This is the discography of West German electro singer and songwriter Billie Ray Martin.

Following her time with Electribe 101 during the 1980s and early 1990s, Billie embarked on a solo career in 1993. Following the release of her first solo single "Persuasion", she had some chart success throughout the remaining 1990s including her biggest hit to date "Your Loving Arms", a top 10 hit in the UK, Ireland and various US dance charts.

Since 2000, though Billie has had very limited commercial success, she has continued producing and releasing studio albums and singles worldwide.

Albums
 Deadline for My Memories (1996) (UK #46)
 18 Carat Garbage (2001)
 18 Carat Garbage Demos (2002)
 Recycled Garbage (2002)
 BRM New Demos (2003)
 The Berlin Years - 1 (Billie and the Deep Live at KOB 1986) (2014)
 The Soul Tapes (2016)

EPs
 4 Ambient Tales (1993)
 Persuasion (1993)
 Your Loving Arms (The Remix EP) (1994)
 Crime & Punishment (1999)
 Four Ambient Tales (2000)
 Sold Life (2011)

Singles

Remixes
 "Imitation of Life" was remixed by Grammy Award winning remixer David Morales.
 Brian Transeau (aka BT) produced remixes for the singles "Space Oasis" and "Running Around Town". 
 Several of Martin's singles have been remixed by Junior Vasquez, including "Your Loving Arms", "Running Around Town", "Space Oasis", "Honey", "18 Carat Garbage" and "Systems of Silence". 
 "Your Loving Arms" and "Imitation of Life" were remixed by Brothers in Rhythm. 
 Roger Sanchez and Todd Terry both remixed "Your Loving Arms". 
 "Honey" was remixed by Above & Beyond, Chicane, and Deep Dish. 
 "Pacemaker" was remixed by E-Smoove.

See also
 List of number-one dance hits (United States)
 List of artists who reached number one on the US Dance chart

References

Martin, Billie Ray
Electronic music discographies